The Ormsby–Rosser House, at 304 S. Minnesota St. in Carson City, Nevada, is a historic house that was built during 1862–63.  It was home of the widow of Major William B. Ormsby, who was killed in 1860 in the Pyramid Lake War.  The house hosted Mark Twain and others.  It was later owned by carpenter/cabinet-maker Sture Svensson, who added an addition in 1960.

It was listed on the National Register of Historic Places in 1979.

References 

Houses on the National Register of Historic Places in Nevada
Houses completed in 1863
National Register of Historic Places in Carson City, Nevada
Houses in Carson City, Nevada
1863 establishments in Nevada